Begonia ludwigii is a species of plant in the family Begoniaceae. Its natural habitats are subtropical or tropical moist lowland forests and subtropical or tropical moist montane forests. It is threatened by habitat loss and it is endemic to Ecuador.

References

Flora of Ecuador
ludwigii
Endangered plants
Taxonomy articles created by Polbot